Eudonia oertneri is a moth in the family Crambidae. It was described by Nuss in 2007. It is found in Kyrgyzstan.

References

Moths described in 2007
Eudonia